Brotopia: Breaking Up the Boys' Club of Silicon Valley is 2018 non-fiction book by Emily Chang. It is her debut book and was published on February 6, 2018, by Portfolio, a division of Penguin Random House. The book investigates and examines sexism and gender inequality in the technology industry of Silicon Valley. It was an instant national bestseller and received significant media attention and critical acclaim.

Background
Chang drew from over two hundred interviews she conducted across the technology industry. Some of the interviews were from her work at Bloomberg, but most were original and conducted for the purposes of the book.

Publication and promotion
Vanity Fair ran an excerpt from the book in their January 2018 issue titled ""Oh My God, This Is So F---ed Up": Inside Silicon Valley’s Secretive, Orgiastic Dark Side". Bloomberg Businessweek ran an excerpt in February 2018 titled "Women Once Ruled the Computer World. When Did Silicon Valley Become Brotopia?".

Brotopia was published on February 6, 2018, by Portfolio, a division of Penguin Random House.

Coverage of the book ran in The New York Times, The New York Times Book Review, San Francisco Chronicle, Financial Times, TechCrunch and The Verge.

Chang appeared on Morning Joe, Good Morning America, CBS This Morning and Marketplace to discuss the book.

The PBS Newshour-New York Times "Now Read This" book club selected Brotopia as their April 2019 book club read. Chang appeared on the PBS Newshour on April 30, 2019, and answered questions from viewers about the book.

Reception
Kirkus Reviews called the book a "thorough, important examination" of Silicon Valley, writing, "Chang's scrutiny breaks open a wide doorway, allowing fresh ideas about a tainted industry to circulate and spark discussions."

The book was longlisted for the Financial Times Business Book of the Year 2018 and the 2018 800-CEO-Read Business Books Awards, and was named one of Amazon's Best Books of the Year So Far, Tech Crunchs Best Tech Books of 2018, and Financial Times Best Books of 2018.

References

2018 non-fiction books
American non-fiction books
Books about women
Debut books
Women in technology
Portfolio (publisher) books